Markelov is a Russian masculine surname, its feminine counterpart is Markelova. It may refer to:

Artem Markelov  (born 1994), Russian racing driver
Ivan Markelov (born 1988), Russian football player
 Leonid Markelov (born 1963), president of the Mari El republic in Russia
Roman Markelov (born 1984), Russian football player
 Stanislav Markelov (1974–2009), Russian human rights lawyer shot dead when leaving news conference in Moscow
 Vladimir Markelov (ice hockey) (born 1987), Russian ice hockey forward
 Vladimir Markelov (gymnast) (born 1957), Russian former gymnast

Russian-language surnames